Edenton is a small unincorporated community in Wayne Township, Clermont County, Ohio. State Routes 133 and 727 intersect through it, and Stonelick State Park is nearby.

History
Edenton was laid out in 1837. A post office called Edenton was established in 1848, and remained in operation until 1983.

Gallery

References

External links
 http://ohio.hometownlocator.com/oh/clermont/edenton.cfm
 http://www.epodunk.com/cgi-bin/genInfo.php?locIndex=16660
 http://parks.ohiodnr.gov/stonelick

Unincorporated communities in Clermont County, Ohio
Unincorporated communities in Ohio